Lin Li-chan (Khmer: លីន លីចាន់; born 2 October 1977) is a Taiwanese politician of Cambodian descent. She was the first  to be elected a member of the Legislative Yuan, on which she served one term, from 2016 to 2020.

Biography
Lin was born in Cambodia to an ethnic Chinese family of Teochew descent. She is a naturalized citizen of Taiwan. Her father died in a traffic collision, and, when she was 20, her mother married Lin to a Taiwanese man, Hsieh Shui-chin, for money. They had two children. She learned Taiwanese Hokkien and Taiwanese Mandarin both around the house and while working at a factory. However, Lin became less able to help her children with schoolwork as they grew older. To improve her fluency in Mandarin, she obtained a master's degree in non-profit organization management at National Chi Nan University. Prior to her political career, Lin was engaged in volunteer work for many causes, including the Taiwan New Immigrant Development and Exchange Association. She has also worked in radio.

Lin was named as a candidate for the 2016 legislative election in November 2015. Listed fourth on the Kuomintang proportional representation ballot, she became the first immigrant to win a seat in the Legislative Yuan.

Near the end of her term in the Ninth Legislative Yuan, Lin was offered an advisory position to the Kaohsiung City Government led by mayor Han Kuo-yu.

References

1977 births
Naturalised citizens of Taiwan
Living people
National Chi Nan University alumni
Kuomintang Members of the Legislative Yuan in Taiwan
Cambodian people of Chinese descent
Cambodian emigrants to Taiwan
Members of the 9th Legislative Yuan
Party List Members of the Legislative Yuan
People from Phnom Penh
Taiwanese radio presenters
Taiwanese women radio presenters
Politicians of the Republic of China on Taiwan from Changhua County